There are several taxons named amphibia. These include:

 Amphibia (class), classis Amphibia, the amphibians

Species
Species with the specific epithet 'amphibia'
 Rorippa amphibia (R. amphibia), a plant
 Persicaria amphibia (P. amphibia), a plant
 Neritina amphibia (N. amphibia), a snail
 Aranea amphibia (A. amphibia), a spider

See also

 Amphibian (disambiguation)
 Amphibia (disambiguation)